The ceremonial county of Shropshire, England (which comprises the local/unitary authorities of Shropshire Council and Telford and Wrekin), is divided into 5 parliamentary constituencies – 1 borough constituency and 4 county constituencies. As with all constituencies for the House of Commons in the modern age, each constituency elects one Member of Parliament by the first-past-the-post system.

Constituencies

2010 boundary changes
Under the Fifth Periodic Review of Westminster constituencies, the Boundary Commission for England decided to retain the 5 constituencies in Shropshire for the 2010 election, making only small changes to the boundary between Telford and The Wrekin to align with current local government wards.

Proposed boundary changes 
See 2023 Periodic Review of Westminster constituencies for further details.

Following the abandonment of the Sixth Periodic Review (the 2018 review), the Boundary Commission for England formally launched the 2023 Review on 5 January 2021. Initial proposals were published on 8 June 2021 and, following two periods of public consultation, revised proposals were published on 8 November 2022. Final proposals will be published by 1 July 2023.

The commission has proposed retaining the current five constituencies in Shropshire, with minor boundary changes to reflect changes to ward boundaries and to bring constituencies within the statutory range. It is proposed that Shrewsbury and Atcham reverts to its original name of Shrewsbury, while Ludlow is renamed South Shropshire.

Results history
Primary data source: House of Commons research briefing – General election results from 1918 to 2019

2019 
The number of votes cast for each political party who fielded candidates in constituencies comprising Shropshire in the 2019 general election were as follows:

Percentage votes 

1Includes National Liberal Party up to 1966

21950-1979 – Liberal; 1983 & 1987 – SDP-Liberal Alliance

* Included in Other

Seats 

1Includes National Liberal Party up to 1966

21950-1979 – Liberal; 1983 & 1987 – SDP-Liberal Alliance

Maps

Historical constituencies

Timeline of parliamentary constituencies in the county, with historical (green) and extant (pink) constituencies.

Historical representation by party
A cell marked → (with a different colour background to the preceding cell) indicates that the previous MP continued to sit under a new party name.

1885 to 1918

1918 to 1945

1945 to 1983

1983 to present

See also
 List of parliamentary constituencies in the West Midlands (region)
 List of United Kingdom Parliament constituencies
 :Category:Members of the Parliament of the United Kingdom for constituencies in Shropshire

Notes

References

 
Shropshire